The Archibald Henderson Law Office is a historic law office building located at Salisbury, Rowan County, North Carolina.

History
The Law Office was built in 1796, and is a one-story, one room, frame building with a low hipped roof and a brick foundation.  It was the law office of Congressman and North Carolina politician Archibald Henderson (1768–1822).  Upon his death, the law office was inherited by his daughter, Jane Caroline Henderson, who married Congressman and jurist, Nathaniel Boyden (1796–1873).

The Office was listed on the National Register of Historic Places in 1972. It is located in the Salisbury Historic District.

See also 
 Alfred Moore Scales Law Office: NRHP listing in Madison, North Carolina
 Brown-Cowles House and Cowles Law Office: NRHP listing in Wilkesboro, North Carolina
 Thomas B. Finley Law Office: NRHP listing in Wilkesboro, North Carolina
 Nash Law Office: NRHP listing in Hillsborough, North Carolina
 Zollicoffer's Law Office: NRHP listing in Henderson, North Carolina
 National Register of Historic Places listings in Rowan County, North Carolina

References

Office buildings on the National Register of Historic Places in North Carolina
Commercial buildings completed in 1796
Buildings and structures in Rowan County, North Carolina
National Register of Historic Places in Rowan County, North Carolina
Individually listed contributing properties to historic districts on the National Register in North Carolina
1796 establishments in North Carolina
Office buildings completed in 1796
Law offices
Legal history of North Carolina